Orgueil is a commune in the Tarn-et-Garonne department in the Occitanie region in southern France.

History
Orgueil has existed for more than 1000 years. It was first mentioned in the 9th century, when Orgueil was part of Saint-Sernin Abbaye in Toulouse.

On 14 May 1864 a rare carbonaceous chondrite meteorite landed there, now known as the Orgueil meteorite. For research purposes, it was split up into several pieces which can now be seen in museums in Europe and the United States. The Museum d'Histoire Naturelle of Montauban in Tarn-et-Garonne, France has a large piece of the meteorite that weighs eleven kilograms.

Economy
Orgueil is also a wine-producing region: the red grape le frontonnais is cultivated there.

See also
Communes of the Tarn-et-Garonne department

References

External links

Official Web site (in French)

Communes of Tarn-et-Garonne